Eddie Fyers is a fictional character, appearing in various comic book series published by DC Comics.

Edward Fyers appeared in the first season and final season of Arrow, played by Sebastian Dunn set in the Arrowverse.

Publication history
Created by Mike Grell, he first appeared in Green Arrow: The Longbow Hunters #3 in 1987.

Fictional character biography
Edward "Eddie" Fyers, was employed by the CIA to shoot and kill the rogue archer Shado.

He appeared frequently in Grell's run on the Green Arrow ongoing series, occasionally in the summer bi-weekly Green Arrow arcs with Shado. Over the course of his appearances, Fyers became less of an enemy to Oliver Queen, aka Green Arrow, and the two often became begrudging allies. Fyers was untrustworthy, however, and would generally leave Green Arrow holding the bag, including implicating Oliver in a terrorist attack on the Panama Canal. After Mike Grell left the Green Arrow series at issue #80, Chuck Dixon and Jim Aparo further developed the character.

He grew to be a father figure to Connor Hawke, Oliver's son and the second to bear the name Green Arrow. Their relationship grew after Oliver died in a plane explosion near Metropolis while fighting off eco-terrorists.

Eddie had promised Oliver to look after his son if anything were to happen to him, which he did, even after Oliver returned from the dead in the Quiver storyline. Fyers was seriously injured in the mini-series Connor Hawke: Dragons Blood, written by Dixon in 2006. He had severe burns all over his body, which he had gotten by protecting Connor and Shado. He was last seen at the wedding of Green Arrow and Black Canary.

Eddie Fyers re-appears in Green Arrow comics following DC Rebirth. Here, Fyers is a mercenary and member of the Ninth Circle, an international criminal organization and bank alongside such assassins like Brick, Shado and Cheshire.

In other media
Edward Fyers appears in the CW TV show, Arrow, portrayed by Sebastian Dunn. He appears as the main antagonist in the first season's flashbacks. Edward Fyers is the field commander for a mercenary unit which also includes Bill Wintergreen on Lian Yu, the same island where Oliver Queen is stranded. Fyers is using the island as a staging area, preparing to shoot down a Ferris Air flight which he believes is to decimate China's economy. He has kidnapped Shado and uses her to force her father Yao Fei, a disgraced and exiled Chinese general, into taking the fall for the attack. After Yao Fei has recorded his "confession", Fyers kills him. In the season one finale, Oliver, Shado, and Slade Wilson foil Fyers' plan and he is killed by Oliver with an arrow to the throat. It is later revealed that Fyers was hired by Amanda Waller, whose real goal was to kill China White. In the season eight episode "Purgatory", Team Arrow and Lyla Michaels encounter Edward and his group on Lian Yu when the energy build-up restored them. When Lyla activates the weapon that is tied to her DNA, the energies are absorbed causing Edward and his group to disappear.

References

Green Arrow characters
Fictional Central Intelligence Agency personnel
Fictional characters from Washington (state)
Fictional private investigators
Comics characters introduced in 1987
Characters created by Mike Grell